Reinecke's salt is a chemical compound with the formula NH4[Cr(NCS)4(NH3)2]·H2O. The dark-red crystalline compound is soluble in boiling water, acetone, and ethanol. The chromium atom is surrounded by six nitrogen atoms in an octahedral geometry. The NH3 ligands are mutually trans and the Cr–NCS groups are linear. The salt crystallizes with one molecule of water.

Structure
It was first reported in 1863. NH4[Cr(NCS)4(NH3)2] is prepared by treatment of molten NH4SCN (melting point around 145–150 °C) with (NH4)2Cr2O7.

Use
This salt was once widely used to precipitate primary and secondary amines as their ammonium salts. Included in the amines that effectively form crystalline precipitates are those derived from the amino acids, including proline and hydroxyproline. It also reacts with Hg2+ compounds, giving a red color or a red precipitate.

References

Chromium complexes
Reagents for organic chemistry
Ammine complexes
Thiocyanates
Chromium(III) compounds
Ammonium compounds